Argentochiloides xanthodorsellus is a moth in the family Crambidae. It was described by Stanisław Błeszyński in 1961. It is found in Tanzania.

References

Crambinae
Moths described in 1961
Moths of Africa
Taxa named by Stanisław Błeszyński